Darwin 1942: The Japanese Attack on Australia is a 2017 book by Bob Alford, illustrated by Jim Laurier. It covers the two air raids on Darwin in the Northern Territory in Australia on 19 February 1942. The bombing of Darwin was often called "Australia's Pearl Harbor": the Imperial Japanese Navy began the attack on 19 February 1942, killing more than 230 people and destroying ships, buildings and infrastructure.

The book was an entry for the Chief Minister's Northern Territory History Book Award in 2018. Alford had previously published two editions of Darwin's Air War 1942-1945. An Illustrated History in 1991 and 2011.

References

History books about World War II
2017 non-fiction books

History of Darwin, Northern Territory